Thug Matrix is an album by the American hip hop musician Tragedy Khadafi, released in 2005. Havoc and Raekwon makes guest appearances on the album.

Track listing

References

2005 albums
Tragedy Khadafi albums
Albums produced by Ayatollah
Albums produced by the Alchemist (musician)
Albums produced by Havoc (musician)